Haabneeme is a small borough in Viimsi Parish, Harju County, in northern Estonia alongside Viimsi. With a population of 5,634 (2011 Census), Haabneeme is the largest settlement in the municipality.

Haabneeme was first mentioned in 1271 as Apones. During the Middle Ages Haabneeme was settled by Coastal Swedes. In the 1960s, Haabneeme garden city developed on both sides of the Rohuneeme road in the north. The central settlement was built from the 1960s to 1980s as the centre of the Kirov Fishing Kolkhoz (named after Sergey Kirov). In 1973 a new administrative building was opened. The shopping centre was built in 1976, hospital-polyclinic in 1979. As an addition to apartment buildings, a pension was opened in 1974, stadium in 1978, kindergarten in 1983 and a high school in 1981–1985.

Recently, many new buildings such as a spa hotel, a new schoolhouse (2006), a kindergarten and a supermarket have been raised.

Haabneeme is connected to the centre of Tallinn by Tallinn Bus Company's route nr. 1A (Viru keskus – Viimsi haigla), average traveling time is about 25 minutes.

A new two storey shopping centre with Selver hypermarket is planned to be opened in Haabneeme in 2015.

Viimsi St. Jacob's Church (also Viimsi St. James' Church) is located in Haabneeme.

Gallery

See also
Viimsi JK
Viimsi Stadium

References

External links
Viimsi Parish 
Viimsi SPA
Viimsi High School 

Boroughs and small boroughs in Estonia